ROCS Ma Kong (馬公, DDG-1805) is a  guided-missile destroyer currently in active service of Republic of China Navy. It is named after Ma Kong City, Penghu Island, a port city and the location of an important ROCN base.

She was formerly the American   which was decommissioned from the United States Navy in September 1999 and sold to the Republic of China Navy on 30 May 2003.

External links 
 

 

Kidd-class destroyers
Kee Lung-class destroyers
Ships built in Pascagoula, Mississippi
1980 ships
Destroyers of the Republic of China